Pseudodinia is a genus of flies in the family Chamaemyiidae. There are about 17 described species in Pseudodinia.

Species
These 17 species belong to the genus Pseudodinia:

P. angelica Barber, 1985 i c g
P. angustata Barber, 1985 i c g
P. antennalis Malloch, 1940 i c g b
P. cinerea Barber, 1985 i c g
P. hamata Barber, 1985 i c g
P. latiphallis Barber, 1985 i c g
P. melanitida Barber, 1985c g
P. melantida Barber, 1985 i c g
P. meridionalis Hennig, 1947c g
P. nigritarsis Barber, 1985 i c g
P. nitens (Melander and Spuler, 1917) i c g
P. obscura Barber, 1985c g
P. occidentalis Barber, 1985 i c g
P. polita Malloch, 1915
P. slussi Barber, 1985 i c g
P. tuberculata Barber, 1985 c g
P. varipes Coquillett, 1902 i c g

Data sources: i = ITIS, c = Catalogue of Life, g = GBIF, b = Bugguide.net

References

Further reading

 

Chamaemyiidae
Articles created by Qbugbot
Lauxanioidea genera